Littoridinops tenuipes, common name the henscomb hydrobe, is a species of very small aquatic snail, an operculate gastropod mollusk in the family Hydrobiidae.

Distribution

Description 
The maximum recorded shell length is 6 mm.

Habitat 
Minimum recorded depth is 0 m. Maximum recorded depth is 0 m.

References

External links

Hydrobiidae
Gastropods described in 1844